Vanessa Claire Wood (born 25 February 1983) is an American engineer who is a professor at the ETH Zurich. She holds a chair in Materials and Device Engineering and serves as Vice President of Knowledge Transfer and Corporate Relations.

Early life and education 
Wood earned her bachelor's degree in physics at Yale University. She moved to Massachusetts Institute of Technology for her graduate studies, where studied electrical engineering. She remained at MIT for graduate research, where she researched quantum dots in metal oxide structures with Vladimir Bulimic. Her research developed strategies to integrate colloidal quantum dots in optoelectronic devices. She created three light-emitting diodes where air-stable metal oxides were used to surround the quantum dot active layers. This can improve the shelf-life and luminance of the light-emitting diodes. She also demonstrated the world's first inorganic quantum dot displays incorporating metal oxide charge transport layers. After earning her doctorate, she worked for a short while as a postdoctoral research with Yet-Ming Chiang. She focused on lithium ion battery flow cells.

Research and career 
In 2011, Wood joined the faculty at ETH Zurich. Her research considered lithium-ion batteries, and how electrode microstructure impacts battery efficiency. She created a new analytical method which can be used to monitor battery electrodes during the manufacturing process. She was awarded a European Research Council starting council grant to develop quantitative metrologie to guide lithium ion battery manufacturing.

Wood founded the spin-off company Battrion in 2015. Battrion looks to improve charging speed of high energy density lithium ion cells through the development of innovative fabrication strategies. She was made full Professor in 2019.

In 2021, Wood was made the Vice President for Knowledge Transfer at ETH Zurich. She was appointed Meeting Chair of the Materials Research Society 2022 Spring Meeting.

Awards and honors 
 2014 BASF Science Prize in Electrochemistry
 2018 MRS Outstanding Early-Career Investigator Award

Selected publications

References 

1983 births
Living people
Yale College alumni
Massachusetts Institute of Technology alumni
American engineers
American women scientists
Academic staff of ETH Zurich
Materials scientists and engineers